Norwood Park may refer to:

In England:
Norwood Park (London)

In the United States:
Norwood Park, Chicago, Illinois, a neighborhood
Norwood Park (Metra)
Norwood Park, Asheville, NC

See also
Norwood Green in the London Borough of Ealing
Norwood Green, West Yorkshire
South Norwood Country Park
South Norwood Lake and Grounds
South Norwood Leisure Centre
South Norwood Recreation Ground
West Norwood Cemetery
Norwood (disambiguation)